Cockeyed may refer to:
 Crooked or askew; not level
 An eye alignment disorder, Strabismus
 A website, Cockeyed.com
Louis Fratto (1907-1967), American labor racketeer and organized crime figure nicknamed "Cock-eyed"